Moscow Uprising may refer to several events that took place in Moscow, Russia:

Moscow Uprising of 1382
Moscow Uprising of 1547
Moscow Uprising of 1612 during the Time of Troubles and Polish–Muscovite War (1605–18)
Moscow Uprising of 1648, also known as the Salt Riot
Moscow Uprising of 1662, also known as the Copper Riot
Moscow Uprising of 1682, also known as the Khovanschina
Moscow Uprising of 1771, also known as the Plague Riot
Moscow Uprising of 1905, also known as the December Uprising

History of Moscow